Ragout  (French ragoût) is a main dish stew.

Etymology

The term comes from the French ragoûter, meaning: "to revive the taste".

Preparation
The basic method of preparation involves slow cooking over a low heat. The main ingredients are many; ragouts may be prepared with or without meat, a wide variety of vegetables may be incorporated, and they may be more or less heavily spiced and seasoned.

Examples

Two 18th-century English dishes from The Compleat Housewife show some of the varying meats, vegetables, seasonings, garnishes and procedures which can be applied to the ragoût.

A Ragoo for made Dishes 
TAKE claret, gravy, sweet-herbs, and savoury spice, toss up in it lamb-stones (i.e. lamb’s testicles), cock's-combs, boiled, blanched, and sliced, with sliced sweet-meats, oysters, mushrooms, truffles, and murrels; thicken these with brown butter; use it when called for.

To make a Ragoo of Pigs-Ears
TAKE a quantity of pigs-ears, and boil them in one half wine and the other water; cut them in small pieces, then brown a little butter, and put them in, and a pretty deal of gravy, two anchovies, an eschalot or two, a little mustard, and some slices of lemon, some salt and nutmeg: stew all these together, and shake it up thick. Garnish the dish with barberries.

In his 19th century culinary dictionary, Alexandre Dumas credits ragouts with making "the ancient French cuisine shine". He gives several examples including salpicons, made with a variety of meats and vegetables like mushrooms, artichokes, truffles, quenelles, and sweetbreads. According to Dumas each ingredient is cooked separately. The "Ordinary Salpicon" includes veal sweetbreads, ham, mushrooms, foie gras and truffles served in espagnole sauce. Celery ragout is cooked in bouillon seasoned with salt, nutmeg and pepper. Cucumber ragout is made with velouté sauce. One ragout is made with madeira, chestnuts and chipolata sausages cooked in bouillon with espagnole sauce.

Popular culture
The 1731 patriotic ballad "The Roast Beef of Old England" by the British writer Henry Fielding comically attributes Britain's traditional military prowess to the eating of roast beef, suggesting that this has been lost since the introduction of ragout from "all-vapouring France".

In the novel Pride and Prejudice, the character Mr Hurst reacts with disdain when Elizabeth Bennet opts for a "plain dish" instead of a ragout at dinner.

In the Haddawy translation of The Arabian Nights, the Steward's tale about "The Young Man from Baghdad and Lady Zubaida's Maid" (beginning during the 121st night and continuing through the 130th night) tells of the suffering of a young man who attempts to consummate his marriage without having washed his hands after having eaten a large quantity of ragout spiced with cumin.

See also
 Khoresh
 List of stews
 Oxtail stew
 Chulent

References

Stews